The Choza Formation is a geologic formation in Texas. It preserves fossils dating back to the Permian period.

References
 

Permian geology of Texas